The Institute of Advanced Technology, University of Science and Technology of China (IAT, USTC) is a research institute affiliated with the University of Science and Technology of China (USTC) and located in Hefei, Anhui, China. It was jointly founded by Anhui provincial government, the Chinese Academy of Sciences, Hefei municipal government and the USTC in 2012.

Research projects

Quantum Communication Satellite
Quantum Communication Satellite's main function is sending entangled photon to all world, for achieving fully classified communication.

Pan Jianwei, Professor of University of Science and Technology of China published a scientific article stating their first space quantum communication experiment on 4, June, 2013. The experiment was finished in 2010 or before using a Germany satellite CHAMP launched in July, 2000. The satellite was out of orbit in September, 2010. On 2011, Pan's project was approved by Chinese Academy of Sciences.

Quantum Communication Beijing-Shanghai Route
On January 12, 2014, China decided to build Quantum Communication Beijing-Shanghai Route.

External links
Official website
QUESS, Quantum Experiments at Space Scale

References

Research institutes in China